This is a round-up of the 1985 Sligo Senior Football Championship. St. Mary's completed their second hat-trick of titles in a seven-year period in this year, and once again Tubbercurry were the beaten finalists. This year's final was unique, as it required three games to decide the issue, and the latter game proved to be a bad-tempered affair, with four Tubbercurry players sent off in the closing minutes. This year's Championship also saw the entry of numerous amalgamations, as the Championship was opened up to Intermediate and Junior clubs to enter their combined resources, but this couldn't prevent a repeat of the outcome of previous years.

First round

Quarter finals

Semi-finals

Championship final

Final replay

Final second replay

References

 Sligo Champion (July–November 1985)

Sligo Senior Football Championship
Sligo Senior Football Championship